Caeau Tir-mawr is a Site of Special Scientific Interest in Carmarthen & Dinefwr,  Wales.

External links
Description at Brecon Beacons National Park website

See also
List of Sites of Special Scientific Interest in Carmarthen & Dinefwr

Sites of Special Scientific Interest in Carmarthen & Dinefwr